Ali Mohamed Riadh (6 June 1904 – 31 January 1978) was an Egyptian footballer who represented Egypt as a forward at both the 1924 and 1928 Summer Olympics.

References

1904 births
1978 deaths
Egyptian footballers
Egypt international footballers
Association football forwards
Footballers at the 1924 Summer Olympics
Footballers at the 1928 Summer Olympics
Olympic footballers of Egypt
20th-century Egyptian people